Kathleen Mary Amelia Bliss (5 July 190813 September 1989) was an English theologian, missionary and official of the World Council of Churches (WCC).

Early life 
Bliss was born in Fulham. She attended Girton College, Cambridge, graduating in theology (First Class, 1931) and history (Second Class, 1929). While at university, she participated in the Student Volunteer Movement.

Bliss left for an extended missionary trip to Tamil Nadu in 1932 under the auspices of the London Missionary Society. She went with her husband Rupert, whom she married that year, and they remained in India until 1939.

Literary career 
Upon her return to England, Bliss began working at the Christian News Letter, then managed by J. H. Oldham. She became assistant editor in 1942 and editor in 1945, in which capacity she served until the publication folded in 1949. From 1950 to 1955, she worked at the BBC as a producer.

World Council of Churches 
In the 1940s and 1950s, Bliss served in various capacities in the WCC, an ecumenical organisation founded in 1948. She became a member of WCC's executive committee in 1954. Her work with WCC focused particularly on the role of women in the church. She published a monograph on the subject in 1952.

Academic career 
From 1967/8 to 1972, Bliss was a senior lecturer in religious studies at the University of Sussex.

Religious views 
Originally a Congregationalist, Bliss had become a member of the Church of England by 1948.

Works 
In addition to the published works listed below, Bliss prepared, but never finished, a book-length biography of J. H. Oldham.

Notes

External links 
 

1908 births
1989 deaths
20th-century English theologians
Alumni of Girton College, Cambridge
English missionaries
English women writers
University of Sussex
World Council of Churches
20th-century English women
20th-century English people